Koçkaya can refer to:

 Koçkaya, Narman
 Koçkaya, Refahiye
 Koçkaya, Sason